Solanum may refer to

Biology
 Solanum, a genus of flowering plants.
 Solanum virus 1, commonly called potato virus X
 Solanum virus 2, commonly called potato virus Y

Other uses
 Solanum, a fictional virus referred to in The Zombie Survival Guide by Max Brooks

See also